The Fengguang iX5 (or Fengon iX5) is a mid-size crossover produced by the Chinese automaker Dongfeng Motor Co., Ltd., under the Dongfeng Sokon (DFSK) sub-brand since 2018. First debuted at the 2018 Beijing Auto Show in China, the iX5 features a coupe-like styling.

Overview

The Fengguang iX5 was launched in the Chinese market in Q4 2018 with pricing starting from 99,800 yuan to 149,800 yuan.

Engines of the iX5 includes a 1.5 liter turbo producing 150 hp and 220 Nm of torque, and a 1.8 liter producing 139 hp and 187 Nm of torque. Transmission options includes a 5-speed manual gearbox or CVT. The operating system of the iX5 features the Baidu Apollo, the artificial intelligence suite developed by Baidu for autonomous driving.

The Fengguang iX5 was later debuted to the South Korean market on 10 October 2019 by DFSK's South Korean official distributor, Shinwon CK Motors. It is known there as the DFSK Fengon iX5. It was also released in Morocco as the DFSK Glory iX5 on 21 February 2020.

In Europe it is sold renamed DFSK F5 (Fengon 5) and the first exports started in Spain and Germany in May 2020.
The European engine is the Euro 6D-Temp approved 1.5 Turbo four-cylinder of FARDA CO. origin which delivers 137 horsepower with CVT gearbox produced by Punch Powertrain and front-wheel drive. The engine is also available in dual fuel version with LPG kit.

References

External links
Official website

Fengguang ix5
Mid-size sport utility vehicles
Front-wheel-drive vehicles
2010s cars
Cars introduced in 2018